HIP 79431 is a red dwarf star with a non-stellar companion in the constellation Scorpius. It has the proper name Sharjah, as selected in the NameExoWorlds campaign by United Arab Emirates, during the 100th anniversary of the IAU. Sharjah is the cultural capital of United Arab Emirates. The star has an apparent visual magnitude of 11.34, which is far too faint to be visible to the naked eye. Based on parallax measurements, this system is located at a distance of 47.4 light-years from the Sun. It is drifting closer with a radial velocity of −5 km/s.

This is an M-type main-sequence star with a stellar classification of M3V. This star is smaller, cooler, dimmer, and less massive than the Sun, but the estimated metal content is 2.5 times as much as the Sun. The level of chromospheric activity does not appear to be unusually high for a star of this class.

In 2010, a superjovian exoplanetary companion was discovered using the radial-velocity method. Since the inclination of the orbit is unknown, only a lower bound on the mass can be determined. It has at least 2.1 times the mass of Jupiter.

See also 
 Gliese 179
 List of extrasolar planets

References 

M-type main-sequence stars
Planetary systems with one confirmed planet
Scorpius (constellation)
079431